Dusan may refer to:

 Dušan, a Slavic given name
 Dusan, a son of Ra's al Ghul
 Stefan Dušan (1308–1355), emperor of Serbia

See also
Doosan Group, a South Korean multinational conglomerate

Slavic masculine given names